Kuta District is a district within Badung Regency of Bali, Indonesia. It is Bali and Indonesia's most internationally oriented and touristic district, home to the world famous Kuta Beach.

It covers 17.52 km2 and was home to 86,657 people as of the 2010 census, after phenomenal growth in the previous decade as workers moved in to support the tourist industry. To the north is Kuta North district, and the south is Kuta South district. It contains five villages, listed below with their areas and their populations at the 2010 Census and 2020 Census.

Subsequent to 2010 the population of Kuta district has declined, reaching 59,160 at the 2020 census, and with an estimated 55,428 people (Dec 2020 end of year), notably with 18,484 Muslims although the majority is still Hindu, unusually high for any virtually any part of Bali outside of Denpasar.  This includes Tuban where the international airport sits on reclaimed land.

References

Districts of Bali
Badung Regency

id:Kuta, Badung